Mujangga (1782–1856) was a Manchu statesman of the late Qing dynasty, belonging to the Gogiya (郭佳) clan. He belonged under the Bordered Blue Banner in the Eight Banners. In 1805, he was awarded the jinshi degree, the highest level in the imperial examination and quickly rose in the ranks of the Qing government. He became a member of the Grand Council in 1828 and gradually grew to exercise a decisive influence on the Daoguang Emperor's policies. Following the demise of Cao Zhenyong, Mujangga became the chief Grand Councillor in 1837. As tensions in Sino-British relations rose in 1839, he became one of the chief advocates of a conciliatory policy towards the British and following the outbreak of the First Opium War, he moved to dismiss Lin Zexu from his position as imperial commissioner in September 1840. Around 1845 he was President of the Hanlin Academy. Mujangga's conciliatory policies created tensions with the allegedly more xenophobic heir apparent, and following his accession to the throne as the Xianfeng Emperor, Mujangga was dismissed from all his positions in 1851.

Mujangga was the teacher of Zeng Guofan — a young Chinese statesman, Confucian scholar, and future general of the Xiang Army during the Taiping Rebellion who later became a mentor to Li Hongzhang, a future diplomat of the Qing Dynasty and trade minister of the Beiyang Navy.

Further reading
Crossley, Pamela Kyle. Orphan Warriors: Three Manchu Generations and the End of the Qing World, page 256. Princeton University Press, 1990.

References

1782 births
1856 deaths
Manchu politicians
Qing dynasty politicians
Grand Councillors of the Qing dynasty
Grand Secretaries of the Qing dynasty
Assistant Grand Secretaries
Viceroys of Zhili
Manchu Bordered Blue Bannermen
Presidents of universities and colleges in China